Andrea Baker (née Taylor) is an American actress. In film, she is known for her role as Peggy Jane in the 1998 film Pleasantville, as well as her voice roles portraying Clover in the French-Canadian animated television series Totally Spies!.

Career
Baker was born in Washington D.C.  After graduating from Georgetown University, she and a friend drove for more than six weeks across the US and eventually ended up in Los Angeles, California. Baker took a six-week "Acting for Commercials" course at Tepper Gallegos Casting, where she was introduced to her future agent, Steve Simon. Taylor also studied scene study in class mentored by Bobby Shaw Chance. She was signed on by Arlene Thornton's voice-over agency and then started voice acting for commercials and television.

Her first on-screen appearance was a small role on General Hospital in 1997. After graduating from DW Brown's studio, she auditioned for a role in the 1998 feature film Pleasantville. Barbara Harris introduced Baker to Nancy Meyers, who hired Baker as an "inner voice" actress on What Women Want. Baker has been working exclusively as a voice actress since 2001.

Besides from film and television, Baker has appeared in several plays for Afternoon Theatre, Basement Productions, and Joanne Baron Studios.

Personal life
Baker met her husband during production of What Women Want. They married in October 2001. They have two children together. They have since divorced.

Filmography

Film

Television

Video games

References

External links
 
 

Living people
American film actresses
American stage actresses
American television actresses
American video game actresses
American voice actresses
Georgetown University alumni
20th-century American actresses
21st-century American actresses
Year of birth missing (living people)